The following outline is provided as an overview and topical guide to Oceania.

Oceania is a geographical, and geopolitical, region consisting of numerous lands—mostly islands in the Pacific Ocean and vicinity.  The term is also sometimes used to denote a continent comprising Australia and proximate Pacific islands.

The boundaries of Oceania are defined in a number of ways. Most definitions include parts of Australasia such as Australia, New Zealand, and New Guinea, and parts of Maritime Southeast Asia.  Ethnologically, the islands of Oceania are divided into the subregions of Melanesia, Micronesia, and Polynesia.

General reference 
 Pronunciation (IPA)
 UK: 
 US: 
 Common English name(s): Oceania, Oceanica
 Official English name(s): Oceania
 Adjectival(s): Oceanian
 Demonym(s): Oceanians

Geography of Oceania 

Geography of Oceania
 Oceania is
 A geopolitical and geographical region
 One of the eight terrestrial realms
 Location
 Pacific Ocean
 Mostly in the South Pacific
 Extreme points of Oceania
 Elevation extremes
 Highest point: Puncak Jaya in Papua at 
 Southernmost points of Oceania
 Extreme points by region
 Extreme points of Australasia
 Extreme points of Australia
 Extreme points of New Zealand
 Extreme points of Papua New Guinea
 Population of Oceania: 34,748,972
 Atlas of Oceania

Geography of Oceania by region 

 Geography of Melanesia
 Geography of Micronesia
 Geography of Polynesia

Geography of Oceania by country and territory 

 Geography of American Samoa
 Geography of the Ashmore and Cartier Islands (Australia)
 Geography of Australia
 Geography of the Cook Islands(New Zealand)
 Geography of the Coral Sea Islands (Australia)
 Geography of Easter Island (Chile)
 Geography of Fiji
 Geography of French Polynesia (France)
 Geography of Guam (United States)
 Geography of Hawaii(United States)
 Geography of Indonesia
 Geography of Kiribati
 Geography of the Marshall Islands
 Geography of the Federated States of Micronesia
 Geography of Nauru
 Geography of New Caledonia (France)
 Geography of New Zealand
 Geography of Niue (New Zealand)
 Geography of Norfolk Island (Australia)
 Geography of the Northern Mariana Islands (United States)
 Geography of Palau
 Geography of Papua New Guinea
 Geography of the Pitcairn Islands (United Kingdom)
 Geography of Samoa
 Geography of the Solomon Islands
 Geography of East Timor
 Geography of Tokelau (New Zealand)
 Geography of Tonga
 Geography of Tuvalu
 Geography of Vanuatu
 Geography of Wallis and Futuna (France)

United States Minor Outlying Islands: 
 Geography of the Ogasawara Islands (Japan):

Environment of Oceania 

Environment of Oceania

Climate of Oceania 

 Climate of American Samoa
 Climate of the Ashmore and Cartier Islands (Australia)
 Climate of Australia
 Climate of the Cook Islands(New Zealand)
 Climate of the Coral Sea Islands (Australia)
 Climate of Easter Island (Chile)
 Climate of Fiji
 Climate of French Polynesia (France)
 Climate of Guam (United States)
 Climate of Hawaii (United States)
 Climate of Indonesia
 Climate of Kiribati
 Climate of the Marshall Islands
 Climate of the Federated States of Micronesia
 Climate of Nauru
 Climate of New Caledonia (France)
 Climate of New Zealand
 Climate of Niue (New Zealand)
 Climate of Norfolk Island (Australia)
 Climate of the Northern Mariana Islands (United States)
 Climate of Palau
 Climate of Papua New Guinea
 Climate of the Pitcairn Islands (United Kingdom)
 Climate of Samoa
 Climate of the Solomon Islands
 Climate of East Timor
 Climate of Tokelau (New Zealand)
 Climate of Tonga
 Climate of Tuvalu
 Climate of Vanuatu
 Climate of Wallis and Futuna (France)

 United States Minor Outlying Islands: 
Climate of the Ogasawara Islands (Japan):

Ecology of Oceania 
 Ecology of the Ashmore and Cartier Islands (Australia)
 Ecology of Easter Island (Chile)
 Ecology of Indonesia

Geology of Oceania 

 Geology of Australia
 Geology of Easter Island (Chile)
 Geology of Indonesia
 Geology of Nauru
 Geology of New Zealand

Wildlife of Oceania 
 Wildlife of Oceanian realm

Flora of Oceania 
 Flora of Oceanian realm

Fauna of Oceania 
 Fauna of Oceanian realm
 Birds of Oceania
 Mammals of Oceania

Natural geographic features of Oceania 

 Islands of Oceania
 Islands of Australasia
 Islands of Australia
 Islands of New Zealand
 Islands of Melanesia
 Islands of Micronesia
 Islands of Polynesia
 Mountains of Oceania
 Ultras in Oceania
 Rivers of Oceania
 Rock formations in Oceania

Regions of Oceania 

Regions of Oceania
 Near Oceania
 Remote Oceania
 United Nations geoscheme for Oceania

Biogeographic divisions of Oceania 

 Realms of Oceania
 Oceanian realm
 Australasian realm

Political divisions of Oceania 

Sovereign states and dependencies (listed in italic) that have at least some territory lying within Oceania:

 
  Ashmore and Cartier Islands
 
 
  Coral Sea Islands
 
 
 
 
 
 
 
 
 
 
 
 
 
 
 
 
 
 
 
 
 
 
 
 
 
 

  United States Minor Outlying Islands: 
  Ogasawara Islands (Japan):

Municipalities of Oceania 

 Cities of Oceania
 Chinatowns in Oceania
 Twin towns and sister cities in Oceania

Demography of Oceania 

Demographics of Oceania

 Demographics of American Samoa
 Demographics of the Ashmore and Cartier Islands (Australia)
 Demographics of Australia
 Demographics of the Cook Islands(New Zealand)
 Demographics of the Coral Sea Islands (Australia)
 Demographics of Easter Island (Chile)
 Demographics of Fiji
 Demographics of French Polynesia (France)
 Demographics of Guam (United States)
 Demographics of Hawaii(United States)
 Demographics of Indonesia
 Demographics of Kiribati
 Demographics of the Marshall Islands
 Demographics of the Federated States of Micronesia
 Demographics of Nauru
 Demographics of New Caledonia (France)
 Demographics of New Zealand
 Demographics of Niue (New Zealand)
 Demographics of Norfolk Island (Australia)
 Demographics of the Northern Mariana Islands (United States)
 Demographics of Palau
 Demographics of Papua New Guinea
 Demographics of the Pitcairn Islands (United Kingdom)
 Demographics of Samoa
 Demographics of the Solomon Islands
 Demographics of East Timor
 Demographics of Tokelau (New Zealand)
 Demographics of Tonga
 Demographics of Tuvalu
 Demographics of Vanuatu
 Demographics of Wallis and Futuna (France)

 United States Minor Outlying Islands: 
 Demographics of the Ogasawara Islands (Japan):

Politics of Oceania

Politics of Oceania by region 

 Politics of American Samoa
 Politics of the Ashmore and Cartier Islands (Australia)
 Politics of Australia
 Politics of the Cook Islands(New Zealand)
 Politics of the Coral Sea Islands (Australia)
 Politics of Easter Island (Chile)
 Politics of Fiji
 Politics of French Polynesia (France)
 Politics of Guam (United States)
 Politics of Hawaii(United States)
 Politics of Indonesia
 Politics of Kiribati
 Politics of the Marshall Islands
 Politics of the Federated States of Micronesia
 Politics of Nauru
 Politics of New Caledonia (France)
 Politics of New Zealand
 Politics of Niue (New Zealand)
 Politics of Norfolk Island (Australia)
 Politics of the Northern Mariana Islands (United States)
 Politics of Palau
 Politics of Papua New Guinea
 Politics of the Pitcairn Islands (United Kingdom)
 Politics of Samoa
 Politics of the Solomon Islands
 Politics of East Timor
 Politics of Tokelau (New Zealand)
 Politics of Tonga
 Politics of Tuvalu
 Politics of Vanuatu
 Politics of Wallis and Futuna (France)

 United States Minor Outlying Islands: 
 Politics of the Ogasawara Islands (Japan):

Governments of the countries and dependencies of Oceania 

 Monarchies in Oceania

 Government of American Samoa
 Government of the Ashmore and Cartier Islands (Australia)
 Government of Australia
 Government of the Cook Islands(New Zealand)
 Government of the Coral Sea Islands (Australia)
 Government of Easter Island (Chile)
 Government of Fiji
 Government of French Polynesia (France)
 Government of Guam (United States)
 Government of Hawaii(United States)
 Government of Indonesia
 Government of Kiribati
 Government of the Marshall Islands
 Government of the Federated States of Micronesia
 Government of Nauru
 Government of New Caledonia (France)
 Government of New Zealand
 Government of Niue (New Zealand)
 Government of Norfolk Island (Australia)
 Government of the Northern Mariana Islands (United States)
 Government of Palau
 Government of Papua New Guinea
 Government of the Pitcairn Islands (United Kingdom)
 Government of Samoa
 Government of the Solomon Islands
 Government of East Timor
 Government of Tokelau (New Zealand)
 Government of Tonga
 Government of Tuvalu
 Government of Vanuatu
 Government of Wallis and Futuna (France)

United States Minor Outlying Islands: 
Government of the Ogasawara Islands (Japan):

Elections in Oceania 

 Elections in American Samoa
 Elections in the Ashmore and Cartier Islands (Australia)
 Elections in Australia
 Elections in the Cook Islands(New Zealand)
 Elections in the Coral Sea Islands (Australia)
 Elections in Easter Island (Chile)
 Elections in Fiji
 Elections in French Polynesia (France)
 Elections in Guam (United States)
 Elections in Hawaii(United States)
 Elections in Indonesia
 Elections in Kiribati
 Elections in the Marshall Islands
 Elections in the Federated States of Micronesia
 Elections in Nauru
 Elections in New Caledonia (France)
 Elections in New Zealand
 Elections in Niue (New Zealand)
 Elections in Norfolk Island (Australia)
 Elections in the Northern Mariana Islands (United States)
 Elections in Palau
 Elections in Papua New Guinea
 Elections in the Pitcairn Islands (United Kingdom)
 Elections in Samoa
 Elections in the Solomon Islands
 Elections in East Timor
 Elections in Tokelau (New Zealand)
 Elections in Tonga
 Elections in Tuvalu
 Elections in Vanuatu
 Elections in Wallis and Futuna (France)

 United States Minor Outlying Islands: 
 Elections in the Ogasawara Islands (Japan):

Political parties in Oceania 

 Political parties in Oceania

 Political parties in Australia
 Political parties in the Cook Islands(New Zealand)
 Political parties in Fiji
 Political parties in Indonesia
 Political parties in Kiribati
 Political parties in the Marshall Islands
 Political parties in the Federated States of Micronesia
 Political parties in Nauru
 Political parties in New Zealand
 Political parties in Niue (New Zealand)
 Political parties in Palau
 Political parties in Papua New Guinea
 Political parties in Samoa
 Political parties in the Solomon Islands
 Political parties in East Timor
 Political parties in Tonga
 Political parties in Tuvalu
 Political parties in Vanuatu

Foreign relations of Oceania 

Foreign relations of Oceania

 Foreign relations of Australia
 Foreign relations of the Cook Islands(New Zealand)
 Foreign relations of Fiji
 Foreign relations of Indonesia
 Foreign relations of Kiribati
 Foreign relations of the Marshall Islands
 Foreign relations of the Federated States of Micronesia
 Foreign relations of Nauru
 Foreign relations of New Zealand
 Foreign relations of Niue (New Zealand)
 Foreign relations of Palau
 Foreign relations of Papua New Guinea
 Foreign relations of Samoa
 Foreign relations of the Solomon Islands
 Foreign relations of East Timor
 Foreign relations of Tokelau (New Zealand)
 Foreign relations of Tonga
 Foreign relations of Tuvalu
 Foreign relations of Vanuatu

Diplomatic missions of Oceania 

 Diplomatic missions of Australia
 Diplomatic missions of the Cook Islands(New Zealand)
 Diplomatic missions of Fiji
 Diplomatic missions of Indonesia
 Diplomatic missions of Kiribati
 Diplomatic missions of the Marshall Islands
 Diplomatic missions of the Federated States of Micronesia
 Diplomatic missions of Nauru
 Diplomatic missions of New Zealand
 Diplomatic missions of Palau
 Diplomatic missions of Papua New Guinea
 Diplomatic missions of Samoa
 Diplomatic missions of the Solomon Islands
 Diplomatic missions of East Timor
 Diplomatic missions of Tonga
 Diplomatic missions of Tuvalu
 Diplomatic missions of Vanuatu

International organizations of Oceania 

 Asia-Pacific Economic Cooperation
 Australian Doctors International
 Council of Regional Organisations in the Pacific
 Gamelan Council
 ITUC-Asia Pacific
 Pacific Islands Forum
 Pacific Islands Trade and Investment Commission
 Pacific Regional Environment Programme
 Secretariat of the Pacific Community
 South Pacific Applied Geoscience Commission

Law and order in Oceania 

Law of Oceania
 Ages of consent in Oceania
 Human rights in Oceania
 LGBT rights in Oceania

Military of Oceania 

 Military history of Oceania

 Military of American Samoa
 Military of Australia
 Military of the Cook Islands(New Zealand)
 Military of Fiji
 Military of Indonesia
 Military of Kiribati
 Military of the Marshall Islands
 Military of the Federated States of Micronesia
 Military of Nauru
 Military of New Caledonia (France)
 Military of New Zealand
 Military of Norfolk Island (Australia)
 Military of the Northern Mariana Islands (United States)
 Military of Palau
 Military of Papua New Guinea
 Military of Samoa
 Military of the Solomon Islands
 Military of East Timor
 Military of Tonga
 Military of Tuvalu
 Military of Vanuatu
 Military of Wallis and Futuna (France)

 United States Minor Outlying Islands: 
 Military of the Ogasawara Islands (Japan)

Local government in Oceania 

Local government in Oceania

History of Oceania 

History of Oceania
Timeline of the history of Oceania
Current events of Oceania

History of Oceania by period 
 2006 in Oceania
 2007
 January 2007 in Oceania
 2009
 2009 flu pandemic in Oceania

History of Oceania by region 

 History of American Samoa
 History of the Ashmore and Cartier Islands (Australia)
 History of Australia
 History of the Cook Islands(New Zealand)
 History of the Coral Sea Islands (Australia)
 History of Easter Island (Chile)
 History of Fiji
 History of French Polynesia (France)
 History of Guam (United States)
 History of Hawaii(United States)
 History of Indonesia
 History of Kiribati
 History of the Marshall Islands
 History of the Federated States of Micronesia
 History of Nauru
 History of New Caledonia (France)
 History of New Zealand
 History of Niue (New Zealand)
 History of Norfolk Island (Australia)
 History of the Northern Mariana Islands (United States)
 History of Palau
 History of Papua New Guinea
 History of the Pitcairn Islands (United Kingdom)
 History of Samoa
 History of the Solomon Islands
 History of East Timor
 History of Tokelau (New Zealand)
 History of Tonga
 History of Tuvalu
 History of Vanuatu
 History of Wallis and Futuna (France)

United States Minor Outlying Islands:  
History of the Ogasawara Islands (Japan):

History of Oceania by subject 
 Economic history of Oceania
 History of the Jews in Oceania
 Military history of Oceania

Culture of Oceania 

Culture of Oceania
 Amusement parks in Oceania
 Architecture of Oceania
 Mosques in Oceania
 Cuisine of Oceania
 Festivals in Oceania
 Film festivals in Oceania
 Humor in Oceania
 Media in Oceania
 National symbols of Oceania
 Coats of arms of Oceania
 Flags of Oceania
 National anthem of Oceania
 Nudity locations
 People of Oceania
 Europeans in Oceania
 Indigenous peoples of Oceania
 Ethnic minorities in Oceania
 Chinatowns in Oceania
 Gurdwaras in Oceania
 Jews in Oceania
 Most common surnames in Oceania
 Prostitution in Oceania
 Public holidays in Oceania
 Records of Oceania

Art in Oceania 
 Art in Oceania
 Cinema of Oceania
 Oceania films
 Literature of Oceania
 Music of Oceania
 Television in Oceania
 Theatre in Oceania

Culture of Oceania by region 

 Culture of American Samoa
 Culture of the Ashmore and Cartier Islands (Australia)
 Culture of Australia
 Culture of the Cook Islands(New Zealand)
 Culture of the Coral Sea Islands (Australia)
 Culture of Easter Island (Chile)
 Culture of Fiji
 Culture of French Polynesia (France)
 Culture of Guam (United States)
 Culture of Hawaii(United States)
 Culture of Indonesia
 Culture of Kiribati
 Culture of the Marshall Islands
 Culture of the Federated States of Micronesia
 Culture of Nauru
 Culture of New Caledonia (France)
 Culture of New Zealand
 Culture of Niue (New Zealand)
 Culture of Norfolk Island (Australia)
 Culture of the Northern Mariana Islands (United States)
 Culture of Palau
 Culture of Papua New Guinea
 Culture of the Pitcairn Islands (United Kingdom)
 Culture of Samoa
 Culture of the Solomon Islands
 Culture of East Timor
 Culture of Tokelau (New Zealand)
 Culture of Tonga
 Culture of Tuvalu
 Culture of Vanuatu
 Culture of Wallis and Futuna (France)

 United States Minor Outlying Islands: 
 Culture of the Ogasawara Islands (Japan):

Languages of Oceania 

Languages of Oceania
 By region
 Austronesian languages
 Central Pacific languages
 Oceanic languages
 Southern Oceanic languages
 Remote Oceanic languages
 By country or territory
 Hawaiian language
 Hawaiian Pidgin
 Fiafia
 Languages of Norfolk Island
 Languages of the Pitcairn Islands
 Endangered languages in Oceania
 Extinct languages of Oceania
 Specific languages
 Maisin language
 Norfuk language
 Pitkern
 Proto-Oceanic language
 Torres Strait Creole

Religion in Oceania 

Religion in Oceania
 Islam in Oceania
 Mosques in Oceania

Religion in Oceania by political division 

 Religion in American Samoa
 Religion in the Ashmore and Cartier Islands (Australia)
 Religion in Australia
 Religion in the Cook Islands(New Zealand)
 Religion in the Coral Sea Islands (Australia)
 Religion in Easter Island (Chile)
 Religion in Fiji
 Religion in French Polynesia (France)
 Religion in Guam (United States)
 Religion in Hawaii(United States)
 Religion in Indonesia
 Religion in Kiribati
 Religion in the Marshall Islands
 Religion in the Federated States of Micronesia
 Religion in Nauru
 Religion in New Caledonia (France)
 Religion in New Zealand
 Religion in Niue (New Zealand)
 Religion in Norfolk Island (Australia)
 Religion in the Northern Mariana Islands (United States)
 Religion in Palau
 Religion in Papua New Guinea
 Religion in the Pitcairn Islands (United Kingdom)
 Religion in Samoa
 Religion in the Solomon Islands
 Religion in East Timor
 Religion in Tokelau (New Zealand)
 Religion in Tonga
 Religion in Tuvalu
 Religion in Vanuatu
 Religion in Wallis and Futuna (France)

 United States Minor Outlying Islands: 
 Religion in the Ogasawara Islands (Japan):

Sports in Oceania 

Sport in Oceania
 Basketball in Oceania
 FIBA Oceania
 Football in Oceania
 Australian rules football in Oceania
 Oceania Football Confederation
 Oceania Footballer of the Year
 Rugby in Oceania
 FORU Oceania Cup
 Skiing in Oceania
 Ski areas and resorts in Oceania
 Swimming in Oceania
 Oceania Swimming Association
 Oceania Swimming Championships
 List of Oceania Championships records in swimming

Economy and infrastructure of Oceania 

Economy of Oceania
 List of Oceanian countries by GDP
 Banking in Oceania
 Banks in Oceania
 Communications in Oceania
 Internet in Oceania
 Television stations in Oceania
 Supermarket chains in Oceania
 Energy in Oceania
 Health care in Oceania
 Transport in Oceania
 Air transportation in Oceania
 Airports in Oceania
 Airlines of Oceania
 List of largest airlines in Oceania
 Rail transport in Oceania
 Town tramway systems in Oceania
 Roads in Oceania
 Water supply and sanitation in Oceania

Economy by country and territory 

 Economy of American Samoa
 Economy of the Ashmore and Cartier Islands (Australia)
 Economy of Australia
 Economy of the Cook Islands(New Zealand)
 Economy of the Coral Sea Islands (Australia)
 Economy of Easter Island (Chile)
 Economy of Fiji
 Economy of French Polynesia (France)
 Economy of Guam (United States)
 Economy of Hawaii(United States)
 Economy of Indonesia
 Economy of Kiribati
 Economy of the Marshall Islands
 Economy of the Federated States of Micronesia
 Economy of Nauru
 Economy of New Caledonia (France)
 Economy of New Zealand
 Economy of Niue (New Zealand)
 Economy of Norfolk Island (Australia)
 Economy of the Northern Mariana Islands (United States)
 Economy of Palau
 Economy of Papua New Guinea
 Economy of the Pitcairn Islands (United Kingdom)
 Economy of Samoa
 Economy of the Solomon Islands
 Economy of East Timor
 Economy of Tokelau (New Zealand)
 Economy of Tonga
 Economy of Tuvalu
 Economy of Vanuatu
 Economy of Wallis and Futuna (France)

 United States Minor Outlying Islands: 
 Economy of the Ogasawara Islands (Japan):

Education in Oceania 

Education in Oceania
 Medical schools in Oceania

See also 

 List of basic geography topics

References

External links 

Oceania
Oceania